Lophocampa dognini, the Rothschild's marbled tiger, is a moth of the family Erebidae. It was described by Walter Rothschild in 1910. It is found in Peru.

Description
Male

Legs orange buff ringed with brown; pectus buff; palpi orange buff, extreme tip of third segment brown; head orange buff; antennae pale brown; thorax orange buff with black dots on tegulae and patagia; abdomen buff washed with a darker shade. Forewing deep orange buff, nervures orange, the whole wing sown with dark brown dots and spots, a quadrate dark brown patch in cell and a larger irregular one on discocellulars. Hindwing semihyaline buff.

Female

Similar but larger.

Length of forewing: male 25 mm and female 28 mm.

References

 
Lophocampa dognini at BOLD Systems

dognini
Moths of South America
Moths described in 1910
Taxa named by Walter Rothschild